John Shuster (born November 3, 1982) is an American curler who lives in Superior, Wisconsin. He led Team USA to gold at the 2018 Winter Olympics, the first American team to ever win gold in curling. He also won a bronze medal at the 2006 Winter Olympics in Turin. He has played in five straight Winter Olympics (2006, 2010, 2014, 2018, 2022) and nine World Curling Championships (2003, 2005, 2006, 2009, 2015, 2016, 2017, 2019, 2021).

Curling career

Pete Fenson rink and 2006 Winter Olympics
Shuster began his international career playing lead for Pete Fenson's team. He played in his first world competition at the 2003 Ford World Men's Curling Championship, where the U.S. finished eighth. The team returned to Worlds at the 2005 Ford World Men's Curling Championship, where they lost in a tiebreaker game after posting an 8–3 round-robin record. The Fenson team won the 2005 United States Olympic Curling Trials and went on to play at the 2006 Winter Olympics, where they won a bronze medal (the first-ever Olympic medal in curling for the U.S.). After the season, Shuster left to form his own team.

2007–2014
Shuster played in his first Worlds as a skip at the 2009 Ford World Men's Curling Championship in Moncton, New Brunswick, finishing with a 7–4 record and losing in a tiebreaker match against Norway to finish fifth. His team won the 2009 United States Olympic Curling Trials and represented the United States at the 2010 Olympic Games in Vancouver.  However, after Shuster missed several crucial last-rock shots in three of the United States' first four matches, U.S. coaches took the unusual step of replacing him with alternate Chris Plys.

After skipping the 2010 Olympic team to a last-place finish, Shuster joined Craig Brown as his third. For the 2010–11 season, Shuster formed his own team again, this time with Zach Jacobson, Jared Zezel, and John Landsteiner. He then replaced Jacobson with longtime teammate Jeff Isaacson at third in the 2012–13 season. Shuster won his second World Curling Tour event as skip at the 2012 St. Paul Cash Spiel, defeating Todd Birr in the final.

After back-to-back bronze medal finishes at the 2012 and 2013 United States Men's Curling Championships, Shuster and his team were selected to participate at the 2013 United States Olympic Curling Trials by the United States Curling Association's High Performance Program committee. Shuster and his team finished first in the round-robin, and played Pete Fenson in the three-game final round, winning after the third game. Thus, Shuster's team represented the United States at the qualifying event for the Olympics and succeeded in securing the final spot at the Olympics for the United States. He again represented the United States at the Winter Olympics in Sochi, marking his third consecutive appearance at the Olympics. However, Shuster's team again got off to a slow start and was unable to recover, finishing in ninth place with a 2–7 win–loss record.

U.S. rejection and 2018 Winter Olympics
Following the U.S. team's Olympic struggles, the United States Curling Association held an athlete combine to determine which curlers to include in their High Performance Program (HPP) aimed at having better success at the next Olympics. Shuster and teammate Landsteiner were two of the athletes dropped from the HPP. In response, Shuster created a new team nicknamed "The Rejects" with Landsteiner at lead, fellow combine reject Matt Hamilton at second, and Tyler George at third, who had not attended the combine due to his work. They maintained this line-up for four seasons and found great success. They defeated both HPP teams to win the gold medal at the National Championships in 2015. Representing the United States at the 2015 World Championship in Halifax, Nova Scotia, Team Shuster missed out on the playoffs when they lost a tiebreaker to Finland's Aku Kauste. As a result of its success, Team Shuster was added to the High Performance Program for 2016.

In Basel, Switzerland, they defeated Japan's Yusuke Morozumi in the bronze medal match, earning the first World Men's medal for the United States since 2007.

At the 2017 United States Olympic Curling Trials, Shuster and his team beat Heath McCormick's team in a best-of-three final series, setting up Shuster's fourth straight Olympics appearance. In the 2018 Winter Olympics in PyeongChang, the U.S. team lost four of its first six matches and needed to win all of its three remaining matches to qualify for the playoffs, but all of its remaining opponents (Canada, Switzerland, and Great Britain) were then among the top four teams.  Nevertheless, the U.S. team won all three matches to finish the round-robin in third place with a record of 5–4. In the semifinals, they defeated Canada's Kevin Koe, a two-time world champion, to reach the gold-medal match versus Niklas Edin's team representing Sweden. The gold-medal game was close through seven ends, with the score tied 5–5, but the United States scored five in the eighth end to set up a 10–7 victory. This was the first Olympic gold medal in curling for the United States.

Post-Olympics
Tyler George left the team after the 2017–18 season and was replaced by Chris Plys. The team represented the United States at the second leg of the 2018–19 Curling World Cup in Omaha, Nebraska, where they beat Niklas Edin in the final in a re-match of the Olympic gold medal match. The team won the 2019 United States Men's Curling Championship and represented the United States at the 2019 World Men's Curling Championship, where they were knocked out in the quarterfinals. Shuster's team was also chosen to represent the United States for the final leg of the Curling World Cup, called the Grand Final, in Beijing. They finished in 6th place.

Shuster defended his United States title at the 2020 United States Men's Championship, defeating Rich Ruohonen in the final to finish the tournament undefeated. The national title would have earned Team Shuster a spot at the final Grand Slam of the season, the Champions Cup, as well as the chance to represent the United States at the 2020 World Men's Curling Championship, but both events were cancelled due to the COVID-19 pandemic. 

Shuster was the skip for the United States team at the 2021 World Men's Curling Championship, which was played in a fan-less bubble in Calgary due to the ongoing COVID-19 pandemic. There, he led his U.S. rink to a 10–3 round robin record, in third place. They played Switzerland in the playoffs, in a game which was delayed a day due to some curlers testing positive for the virus. In the game, Switzerland, skipped by Peter de Cruz, beat the Americans to advance to the semifinals.

Mixed doubles
Shuster competes in mixed doubles curling with Cory Christensen. The pair finished in second place at the 2017 United States Mixed Doubles Curling Olympic Trials and earned a national championship in 2019. At the 2019 World Championship Shuster and Christensen finished the round robin tied for first in their group with a record of 6–1. They later lost to Canada in the semifinals but defeated the Australian team of Dean Hewitt and Tahli Gill for the bronze medal.

2022 Winter Olympics 
Shuster competed for Team USA in the men's curling tournament at the 2022 Winter Olympics in Beijing. He served as one of the American flag bearers at the opening ceremony.

Personal life
Shuster is married to Sara Shuster and has two children. He was employed as a "Team USA Sales Associate" for Dick's Sporting Goods, and now works as a public speaker. He lives in Superior, Wisconsin.

In November 2022, Shuster became co-owner of Duluth FC in the National Premier Soccer League.

Grand Slam record

Teams

Men's

Mixed doubles

References

External links

 NBC Sports, 2018 Olympics, Shuster and Team USA defeat Sweden to win

1982 births
Living people
People from Chisholm, Minnesota
American male curlers
Olympic curlers of the United States
Curlers at the 2006 Winter Olympics
Curlers at the 2010 Winter Olympics
Curlers at the 2014 Winter Olympics
Curlers at the 2018 Winter Olympics
Olympic bronze medalists for the United States in curling
Olympic gold medalists for the United States in curling
Medalists at the 2006 Winter Olympics
Medalists at the 2018 Winter Olympics
Sportspeople from Minnesota
Sportspeople from Superior, Wisconsin
Universiade medalists in curling
Continental Cup of Curling participants
American curling champions
Universiade gold medalists for the United States
Competitors at the 2007 Winter Universiade
Medalists at the 2007 Winter Universiade
Curlers at the 2022 Winter Olympics
American people of Slovenian descent